Michael Jordan Woodard (born October 6, 1997) is an American singer and voice actor. He made it to the top 5 on season 16 of American Idol before being eliminated. He is the voice of Arlo in the Netflix film Arlo the Alligator Boy and the follow-up series I ♥ Arlo, for which he has received award nominations.

Personal life
Woodard is from South Philadelphia and was raised in East Falls by his mother and grandmother. His mother Wanda is visually impaired. He attended William M. Meredith School and was also homeschooled for some time. He sung in the church choir at Greater Saint Matthew Baptist Church. His first experience in music was singing "A Little Candle" at a Christmas pageant. When he was eight, he auditioned for a children's play at his local performing arts school. In 2016, he moved to Los Angeles after accepting a degree at the Musicians Institute. At the time of American Idol, he was working as a bowling alley attendant.

Career
In 2009, Woodard performed the national anthem for the Philadelphia Freedoms at King of Prussia and for the last men's quarterfinal match at the US Open. He performed at the US Open again in 2010, and months later performed at a rally for President Barack Obama.

In 2012, Woodard was the winner of The Hub's Majors & Minors, where American Idol alumni Jennifer Hudson, Jordin Sparks and Adam Lambert appeared as guest mentors with partnership of RCA Music Group as his prize.

Woodard auditioned for American Idol in 2017, singing "Make It Rain". Throughout the competition he sang "You Oughta Know", "Golden Slumbers", "Angel in Blue Jeans", "Titanium", "Believe In Yourself", "Beauty and the Beast", "I Would Die 4 U", and "Flat on the Floor". He was eliminated alongside Cade Foehner in the top 5.

Woodard had his voice acting debut in 2021, starring as the titular character in the Netflix animated musical film Arlo the Alligator Boy. Director Ryan Crego cast him after seeing his American Idol audition. Woodard reprised the role in the follow-up series I ♥ Arlo.

In May 2021, Woodard was signed to Unsub Records, the record label of American Idol judge Katy Perry.

Woodard has cited influence from such artists as Trey Songz, Rihanna, Fleetwood Mac, Paul McCartney, Michael Jackson, Tina Turner, Whitney Houston, and Brandy.

Filmography

Discography

Singles

Awards and nominations

References

1997 births
Living people
21st-century African-American male singers
American Idol participants
Singing talent show winners
Singers from Pennsylvania
Musicians from Philadelphia
American male voice actors
Unsub Records artists